Sheldon is a town in Franklin County, Vermont, United States. The population was 2,136 at the 2020 census. It contains the unincorporated community of Sheldon Springs.

Geography
Sheldon, named for Revolutionary War colonel Elisha Sheldon, is located in central Franklin County on both sides of the Missisquoi River, a west-flowing tributary of Lake Champlain. Vermont Route 105 follows the river for most of its way through the town, leading east into Enosburg Falls and southwest to St. Albans, the county seat. Vermont Route 78 leads northwest from Sheldon Junction down the Missisquoi to Highgate Center and Swanton. Vermont Route 120 leads north from North Sheldon to Franklin, and Vermont Route 236 leads north from South Franklin (in the eastern part of Sheldon) to East Franklin. Sheldon Springs is in the west part of Sheldon along Route 105 south of the Missisquoi.

Demographics

As of the census of 2000, there were 1,990 people, 672 households, and 544 families residing in the town. The population density was 51.5 people per square mile (19.9/km2). There were 691 housing units at an average density of 17.9 per square mile (6.9/km2). The racial makeup of the town was 95.38% White, 0.15% African American, 2.31% Native American, 0.10% Pacific Islander, and 2.06% from two or more races. Hispanic or Latino of any race were 0.45% of the population. 39% were of French and French Canadian ancestry, 14% Irish, and 10% English.

There were 672 households, out of which 42.7% had children under the age of 18 living with them, 65.9% were married couples living together, 10.0% had a female householder with no husband present, and 19.0% were non-families. 12.9% of all households were made up of individuals, and 4.0% had someone living alone who was 65 years of age or older. The average household size was 2.94 and the average family size was 3.15.

In the town, the population was spread out, with 31.0% under the age of 18, 6.5% from 18 to 24, 31.9% from 25 to 44, 22.9% from 45 to 64, and 7.6% who were 65 years of age or older. The median age was 34 years. For every 100 females, there were 96.3 males. For every 100 females age 18 and over, there were 97.6 males.

The median income for a household in the town was $42,179, and the median income for a family was $45,833. Males had a median income of $30,870 versus $23,833 for females. The per capita income for the town was $17,134. About 8.2% of families and 10.5% of the population were below the poverty line, including 10.5% of those under age 18 and 17.7% of those age 65 or over.

Notable people

 Lorenzo A. Babcock, first Attorney General of Minnesota Territory
 Elihu Goodsell, Wisconsin legislator and businessman was born in Sheldon
 Heber C. Kimball, nineteenth-century Mormon apostle, born in Sheldon
 Bob Laraba, professional and collegiate football player

References

External links 

 
Towns in Vermont
Burlington, Vermont metropolitan area
Towns in Franklin County, Vermont